The Andaman cuckooshrike (Coracina dobsoni) is a species of bird in the family Campephagidae. It is endemic to the Andaman Islands. It was formerly considered a subspecies of the bar-bellied cuckooshrike.

References

Rasmussen, P.C., and J.C. Anderton. 2005. Birds of South Asia. The Ripley guide. Volume 2: attributes and status. Smithsonian Institution and Lynx Edicions, Washington D.C. and Barcelona.

Andaman cuckooshrike
Birds of the Andaman Islands
Andaman cuckooshrike
Andaman cuckooshrike